Henry Wyndham, 2nd Baron Leconfield,  (31 July 1830 – 6 January 1901) was a British peer and Conservative Member of Parliament.

A direct descendant of Sir John Wyndham, Leconfield was the eldest son of George Wyndham, 1st Baron Leconfield, and Mary Fanny Blunt. His father was the eldest natural son and adopted heir of George O'Brien Wyndham, 3rd Earl of Egremont, and had succeeded to the Egremont estates on the death of his cousin the fourth Earl of Egremont in 1845. George Wyndham was his nephew.

Wyndham was educated at Eton and Christ Church, Oxford, and after leaving university joined the 1st Life Guards, from which he retired with the rank of captain.

He was elected to the House of Commons for West Sussex in 1854, a seat he held until he succeeded his father as second Baron in 1869 and entered the House of Lords. He was a justice of the peace (JP) and a deputy lieutenant (DL) for Sussex, and vice-chairman and alderman of the Western Division of the Sussex County Council.

Lord Leconfield married Lady Constance Primrose, daughter of Archibald Primrose, Lord Dalmeny, and sister of Prime Minister Archibald Primrose, 5th Earl of Rosebery, in 1867. They had six sons and three daughters. His eldest son, Hon. George O′Bryen Wyndham died before his father in 1895. One of his sons, the Hon. William Reginald Wyndham, was killed on the Western Front in 1914 and is buried at Zillebeke Churchyard Commonwealth War Graves Commission Cemetery in Belgium.
His daughter Mary married Ivor Maxse.
Lord Leconfield died at his town-residence in Chesterfield-gardens on 6 January 1901, aged 70, and was succeeded in the barony by his second but eldest surviving son Charles. Lady Leconfield died in 1939. His daughter Maud Evelyn Wyndham was the mother of Henry Vincent Yorke, better known as the novelist Henry Green.

Notes

References 
Kidd, Charles, Williamson, David (editors). Debrett's Peerage and Baronetage (1990 edition). New York: St Martin's Press, 1990,

External links 
 

Leconfield, Henry Wyndham, 2nd Baron
Leconfield, Henry Wyndham, 2nd Baron
Leconfield, Henry Wyndham, 2nd Baron
Leconfield, Henry Wyndham, 2nd Baron
Conservative Party (UK) MPs for English constituencies
UK MPs 1852–1857
UK MPs 1857–1859
UK MPs 1859–1865
UK MPs 1865–1868
UK MPs 1868–1874
Leconfield, Henry Wyndham, 2nd Baron
Henry
Younger sons of barons